Stephen Hazelton Slater (1885 – 1 February 1948) was a rugby union player who represented Australia.

Slater, a prop, was born in Manly, New South Wales and claimed 1 international rugby cap for Australia.

References

1885 births
1948 deaths
Australian rugby union players
Australia international rugby union players
People from Manly, New South Wales
Rugby union players from Sydney
Rugby union props